Stuhr is a municipality in the district of Diepholz, in Lower Saxony, Germany. It is situated approximately 7 km southwest of Bremen. The biggest cities in Stuhr are Brinkum, Fahrenhorst, Groß Mackenstedt, Heiligenrode (Neukrug), Moordeich, Seckenhausen, Stuhr and Varrel. The most populous of these is Brinkum.

Twin towns – sister cities

Stuhr is twinned with:
 Alcalá de Guadaíra, Spain
 Écommoy, France
 Ostrzeszów, Poland
 Sigulda, Latvia

References

Diepholz (district)